= Severn Sea =

Severn Sea may refer to:

- the Bristol Channel
- a rosemary cultivar
